Calloodes rayneri, the green scarab beetle or Christmas beetle, is a species of shining leaf chafers of the family Scarabaeidae.

Description
Calloodes rayneri has  bright metallic-green body and reddish legs. It is quite common in northern Australia at Christmas time (hence the common name). Larvae probably live in sandy habitats.

Distribution
This species can be found in coastal area of Queensland (Australia).

References

 Smith A. B. T. (2003) Checklist of the world Anoplognathini

Rutelinae